Madrepora prolifera is an unaccepted scientific name and may refer to two species of corals:
 Acropora prolifera, found from the Gulf of Mexico and the Bahamas southwards to Colombia and Venezuela
 Lophelia pertusa, found in the North Atlantic Ocean and parts of the Caribbean Sea